Five-time defending champions Nick Taylor and David Wagner defeated Andrew Lapthorne and Lucas Sithole in the final, 6–3, 7–5 to win the quad doubles wheelchair tennis title at the 2014 US Open.

Draw

Final

External links
 Draw

Wheelchair Quad Doubles
U.S. Open, 2014 Quad Doubles